"Rattlesnake" is a song by alternative rock group Live, which was released as the fourth and final single from their 1997 album, Secret Samadhi.


Chart positions
In the US, the song peaked at No. 18 on the Billboard Modern Rock Tracks chart and No. 15 on the Mainstream Rock Tracks chart. In Canada, "Rattlesnake" reached No. 13 on the RPM Alternative chart.

Track listings

USA Promo CD single (RAR3P-90090)
Tracks 2,3,4 and 5 recorded in Melbourne, Australia in May 1997, mixed by Jay Healy.
"Rattlesnake" (LP version) - 4:51
"Rattlesnake" (Live version) - 4:55
"Lakini's Juice" (Live version) - 4:55
"Freaks" (Live version) - 5:08
"Turn My Head" (Live version) - 4:08

References

External links
Official band website

Live (band) songs
1997 singles
1997 songs
Songs written by Ed Kowalczyk
Radioactive Records singles